Ramassamy is a surname.

People with the surname 

 Albert Ramassamy (1923–2018), French politician from Réunion
 Nadia Ramassamy (born 1961), French politician from Réunion
 Nelly Ramassamy (born 1983), French gymnast

See also 

 Ramasamy

Surnames
Surnames of Indian origin